Xyleborus volvulus is a species of typical bark beetles in the family Curculionidae. It is found in North America.

Xyleborus volvulus beetles are found in all tropical and subtropical climates, mostly in Mexico. Their distribution is limited by cold (absent from higher elevations) and low humidity (absent from desert regions) conditions.

References

 Poole, Robert W., and Patricia Gentili, eds. (1996). "Coleoptera". Nomina Insecta Nearctica: A Check List of the Insects of North America, vol. 1: Coleoptera, Strepsiptera, 41-820.

Further reading

 Arnett, R.H. Jr., M. C. Thomas, P. E. Skelley and J. H. Frank. (eds.). (2002). American Beetles, Volume II: Polyphaga: Scarabaeoidea through Curculionoidea. CRC Press LLC, Boca Raton, FL.
 Arnett, Ross H. (2000). American Insects: A Handbook of the Insects of America North of Mexico. CRC Press.
 Richard E. White. (1983). Peterson Field Guides: Beetles. Houghton Mifflin Company.

External links

 NCBI Taxonomy Browser, Xyleborus volvulus

Scolytinae
Beetles described in 1775
Taxa named by Johan Christian Fabricius